Atlantis, in comics may refer to:
Atlantis in comics, a wide range of fictional islands within the comic books based on the mythical city.
 Atlantis (Aquaman), a setting in books published by DC Comics
 Atlantis (Marvel Comics), a setting in books published by Marvel Comics

See also
Atlantis (disambiguation)